Thomas Frith BD (1569 - 9 March 1631) was a Canon of Windsor from 1610 to 1631

Career

He was educated at Magdalen Hall, Oxford and All Souls College, Oxford and graduated MA in 1594 and BD in 1604.

He was appointed:
Rector of Elmley, Kent

He was appointed to the sixth stall in St George's Chapel, Windsor Castle in 1610 and held the canonry until 1631.

Notes 

1569 births
1631 deaths
Canons of Windsor
Alumni of All Souls College, Oxford